State Route 401 (SR 401) is a state highway in Pershing County, Nevada. The route, known as Rye Patch Road, serves the Rye Patch State Recreation Area.

Route description

The western terminus of Rye Patch Road is at a parking lot adjacent to a day use area on the southwestern shore of the Rye Patch Reservoir. From there, SR 401 loops around to head eastward, providing additional campground and recreation area access. The highway follows the southern edge of the reservoir and crosses the Humboldt River on Rye Patch Dam before cutting through mountains and continuing eastward.

History
SR 401 was added to the state highway system on July 30, 1976.

Major intersections

See also

References

401
Transportation in Pershing County, Nevada